The 2021 Inter-Provincial Trophy was the ninth edition of the Inter-Provincial Trophy, a Twenty20 cricket competition that was played in Ireland in 2021. It was the fifth edition of the competition to be played with full Twenty20 status. The tournament was played as a series of three-day festivals between four teams. On 25 March 2021, Cricket Ireland confirmed the fixtures for the tournament. On 9 April 2021, Cricket Ireland announced the revised fixtures for the tournament, with number of matches increased from 12 to 18. Leinster Lightning were the defending champions.

After the first round of matches, North West Warriors were leading the competition with two wins from their three games. Defending champions Leinster Lightning suffered two defeats from their three matches. It was the first time that Leinster Lightning had lost back-to-back matches in the Inter-Provincial competition. In the second round of matches, Leinster Lightning won two of their three matches, putting them in second place behind North West Warriors. In the third and final round of matches, the first three games were all abandoned due to the weather. In the last match of the tournament, North West Warriors beat Leinster Lightning by eight wickets to win their second title.

Points table

Fixtures

Round one

Round two

Round three

References

External links
 Series home at ESPN Cricinfo

Inter
Inter-Provincial Trophy seasons